Zadorye is a rural locality (a village) in Bereznitskoye Rural Settlement of Ustyansky District, Arkhangelsk Oblast, Russia. The population was 99 as of 2010.

Geography 
Zadorye is located on the Ustya River, 37 km northeast of Oktyabrsky (the district's administrative centre) by road. Bereznik is the nearest rural locality.

References 

Rural localities in Ustyansky District